Nightmares & Dreamscapes is a short story collection by American author Stephen King, published in 1993.

Stories

Dedication
King dedicated this collection of stories to Thomas Williams, a writing instructor who taught for many years at the University of New Hampshire. Since the book's publication, King has singled out Williams' 1974 National Book Award-winning novel The Hair of Harold Roux as a favorite of his, and one he returns to "again and again."

The dedication reads:

In memory of
THOMAS WILLIAMS,
1926–1990:
poet, novelist, and
great American storyteller.

Adaptations

Film and television
"Sorry, Right Number" was telecast as a season 4 episode of Tales from the Darkside in 1987 before it was published in Nightmares & Dreamscapes. "The Moving Finger" was adapted into a season 3 episode of Monsters in 1991. "Chattery Teeth" was adapted into a segment of the 1997 film Quicksilver Highway. "The Night Flier" and "Dolan's Cadillac" were both adapted into films of the same respective names, in 1997 and 2009, respectively. "Home Delivery" and "Rainy Season" were adapted into short films.

Miniseries
During the summer of 2006, TNT produced the eight-episode miniseries Nightmares & Dreamscapes: From the Stories of Stephen King. Despite the title, three of the eight stories were not culled from the book: "Battleground", from Night Shift (1978); and "The Road Virus Heads North" and "Autopsy Room Four", from Everything's Eventual (2002).

See also
1993 in literature
Stephen King short fiction bibliography

References

1993 short story collections
American short story collections
Short story collections by Stephen King
Viking Press books